Leonardo Olguín (born 8 October 1975) is a former professional tennis player from Argentina.

Biography
Olguín, who comes from Mendoza, had wins over Gustavo Kuerten, Magnus Norman and Nicolás Lapentti as a junior.

His professional appearances were mostly restricted to the Challenger tour, where he won a total of four titles, all in doubles. He reached the top 200 in the rankings for both singles and doubles during his career.

At the 2001 Copa AT&T in Buenos Aires, Olguín made the main round of his first ATP Tour tournament, qualifying for the doubles event with Diego del Río. He returned to the Buenos Aires tournament in 2002 and qualified for the singles. His first round opponent was third seed Nicolás Lapentti, who won the match in three sets.

He got to the third round of qualifying at the 2002 French Open.

Since 2003 he has been involved in coaching. He worked for many years with Martín Vassallo Argüello and is the Director of the Florida Tennis Club in Buenos Aires.

Challenger titles

Doubles: (4)

References

External links
 
 

1975 births
Living people
Argentine male tennis players
Argentine tennis coaches
Sportspeople from Mendoza, Argentina
21st-century Argentine people